Sydney Russell Hayhow (29 June 1906 – 28 June 1978) was an Australian rules footballer who played with St Kilda and Hawthorn in the Victorian Football League (VFL).

Notes

External links 

1906 births
1978 deaths
Australian rules footballers from Melbourne
St Kilda Football Club players
Hawthorn Football Club players
People from Northcote, Victoria